The Fighters is a 1974 documentary film directed by Rick Baxter and William Greaves. With Muhammad Ali, Joe Frazier, Richie Havens, and Burt Lancaster.

External links

References

1974 films
1974 documentary films